Gerken may refer to:
 Barbara Gerken (born 1964), an American former international tennis player
 Dean Gerken (born 1985), an English football player
 George Gerken (1903–1977), a Major League Baseball outfielder
 Heather K. Gerken
 Jason Gerken
 LouAnn Gerken (born 1959), a Professor of Psychology, Linguistics and Cognitive Science at the University of Arizona
 Lüder Gerken
 Martin Gerken
 Paul Gerken (born 1950), an American former professional tennis player
 Robert Gerken
 Rudolph Gerken (1886-1943), U.S. Catholic archbishop

See also
Gerkens